The Olomouc Research Library (Czech: Vědecká knihovna v Olomouci) is a public library in Olomouc, Czech Republic.

The library was established in 1566 by the Olomouc college and served until 1860 as University of Olomouc Library.

Nowadays it is one of the largest libraries in the Czech Republic with unique collection of historical sources, among others 1451 manuscripts and 1700 incunables.

Libraries in the Czech Republic
Buildings and structures in Olomouc
Libraries established in 1566
1566 establishments in Europe